William Roy James (10 May 1900 – 27 December 1966) was an Australian rules footballer who played one game with the Richmond Football Club in the Victorian Football League—the 1920 VFL Grand Final.

James came from Kyabram, and his only game landed him a VFL premiership medallion. He helped Richmond earn the Tigers their inaugural VFL premiership, with his only goal late in the last quarter sealing the victory. James was retrospectively awarded a life membership for his contribution.

According to legend, James was accidentally shot in the foot whilst out hunting prior to the commencement of the 1921 season, an injury which supposedly ended his football career. However, in 2018, new historical research proved this false, as the injury occurred in 1925, a full four years after his last VFL match.

References 

 Hogan P: The Tigers Of Old, Richmond FC, Melbourne 1996

External links

1900 births
1966 deaths
VFL/AFL Players who played their first game in a Grand Final
Richmond Football Club players
Richmond Football Club Premiership players
Kyabram Football Club players
Australian rules footballers from Victoria (Australia)
Place of birth missing
Place of death missing
One-time VFL/AFL Premiership players